Little Stretton Halt was a minor railway station on the Welsh Marches Line between Craven Arms and Church Stretton in Shropshire, England.

History
Opened by the independent Shrewsbury and Hereford Railway in 1852–53, the line through Little Stretton became the joint property of the Great Western Railway and the London and North Western Railway (LNWR) in 1870; the LNWR interest passed to the London, Midland and Scottish Railway during the Grouping of 1923. Little Stretton Halt was opened on that line on 18 April 1935; it closed temporarily between 4 January 1943 and 6 May 1946. The line then passed on to the London Midland Region of British Railways on nationalisation in 1948. The station was closed by the British Transport Commission on 9 June 1958.

The site today
Trains continue to run on the Welsh Marches Line. Nothing remains of the halt. The nearest station to Little Stretton is now at Church Stretton, a mile to the north.

See also
All Stretton Halt railway station

Notes

References

 
 
 
 Little Stretton Halt on navigable 1954 O.S. map

Church Stretton
Disused railway stations in Shropshire
Former Shrewsbury and Hereford Railway stations
Railway stations in Great Britain opened in 1935
Railway stations in Great Britain closed in 1943
Railway stations in Great Britain opened in 1946
Railway stations in Great Britain closed in 1958